A hill with a trig point pillar to the east of Cold Overton Park Wood is, at 197 m (646 ft), the highest point in the county of Rutland, England. The summit is southwest of the Glebe Farm radio relay mast on the road between Oakham and Knossington, and adjacent to the county boundary with Leicestershire. From the peak, there are views of Rutland Water.

It falls within the historic parkland of Flitteriss Park.

References

External links
British Walks

Geography of Rutland
Highest points of English counties
Parks and open spaces in Rutland
Oakham